The 2018 European Amateur Team Championship took place 10–14 July at the Bad Saarow Golf Club, on its Faldo Course Berlin,  It was the 35th men's golf European Amateur Team Championship.

Venue 
The hosting course, designed by Sir Nick Faldo, located in Bad Saarow, Germany, 50 kilometres south-east of the city center of Berlin, opened in 1996. It had previously hosted the 2000 Eisenhower Trophy and Espirito Santo Trophy.

The championship course was set up with par 72.

Format 
Each team consisted of six players, playing two rounds of an opening stroke-play qualifying competition over two days, counting the five best scores each day for each team.

The eight best teams formed flight A, in knock-out match-play over the next three days. The teams were seeded based on their positions after the stroke play. The first placed team was drawn to play the quarter final against the eight placed team, the second against the seventh, the third against the sixth and the fourth against the fifth. Teams were allowed to use six players during the team matches, selecting four of them in the two morning foursome games and five players in to the afternoon single games. Teams knocked out after the quarter finals played one foursome game and four single games in each of their remaining matches. Games all square at the 18th hole were declared halved, if the team match was already decided.

The eight teams placed 9–16 in the qualification stroke-play formed flight B, to play similar knock-out play, with one foursome game and four single games in each match, to decide their final positions.

Teams 
16 nation teams contested the event. Finland, Portugal, the Netherlands and Serbia qualified by finishing first, second, third and fourth at the 2017 Division 2. Serbia, taking part for the first time, qualified since last year's silver medalist Norway did not take part. Each team consisted of six players.

Players in the leading teams

Other participating teams

Winners 
Tied leaders of the opening 36-hole competition were team Sweden and team England, each with a 27-under-par score of 693, eleven strokes ahead of team Denmark. Sweden earned first place on the tie breaking better non-counting scores. Host country Germany, on fourth place, was another stroke behind.

There was no official award for the lowest individual score, but individual leader was Gian-Marco Petrozzi, England, with a 12-under-par score of 132, two strokes ahead of three players.

Team Finland won the gold medal, earning their first title, beating eleven-times-champion team England in the final 5–2. Team Finland finished 16th and last at the 2016 championship and was moved to the second division for 2017. They came back to the championship for 2018, finishing 8th at the initial qualifying competition and made the quarter finals by a single stroke.

Denmark earned the bronze on third place, after beating host country Germany 5–2 in the bronze match.

Italy, Portugal and Serbia placed 14th, 15th and 16th and was moved to Division 2 for 2019, to be replaced by Belgium, Slovenia, and Wales, who finished first, second, and third respectively in the 2018 Division 2.

Results 
Qualification round

Team standings

* Note: In the event of a tie the order was determined by thebest total of the two non-counting scores of the two rounds.

Individual leaders

Note: There was no official award for the lowest individual score.

Flight A

Bracket

Final games

* Note: Game declared halved, since team match already decided.

Flight B

Bracket

Final standings

Sources:

See also 
 Eisenhower Trophy – biennial world amateur team golf championship for men organized by the International Golf Federation.
 European Ladies' Team Championship – European amateur team golf championship for women organised by the European Golf Association.

References

External links 
European Golf Association: Full results

European Amateur Team Championship
Golf tournaments in Germany
European Amateur Team Championship
European Amateur Team Championship
European Amateur Team Championship